Ester Toivonen (August 7, 1914 Hamina — December 29, 1979 Helsinki) was elected Miss Finland in 1933. She was 19 and working in a bread shop in Helsinki when she was discovered by the director of the Helsinki Golf-Casino, where the Finnish pageant was to be held. She also won the Miss Europe Contest in Great Britain 1934. Later she became a film star.

References 
 YLE Elävä arkisto

External links
 

1914 births
1979 deaths
People from Hamina
People from Viipuri Province (Grand Duchy of Finland)
Miss Finland winners
Miss Europe winners